Pondicherry is a 2022 Indian Marathi-language relationship drama film directed by Sachin Kundalkar and produced by Creative Vibe Productions shot entirely on smartphone.  The film stars Sai Tamhankar, Vaibhav Tatwawadi and Amruta Khanvilkar are in lead roles. Pondicherry was scheduled to be theatrically release on 25 February 2022. Planet Marathi OTT is the official streaming partner of this film.

Plot
Nikita and her eight-year-old son, Ishan, stay in an old family villa in Pondicherry that Nikita lets out as a homestay for travelers. Nikita is from Maharashtra and her Tamil husband Vishnu who worked in the Merchant Navy has been missing in a maritime accident. A broker specializing in getting people to sell old family homes – through deception or force – to hospitality companies arrives at Nikita's homestay, giving all their lives an unexpected twist.

Cast 
 Sai Tamhankar as Nikita
 Vaibhav Tatwawadi as Rohan
 Amruta Khanvilkar as Manasi
 Tanmay Kulkarni as Ishan
 Neena Kulkarni as Aai
 Mahesh Manjrekar
 Gaurav Ghatnekar

Production 
The film was entirely shot on iPhone with only 15 crew members.

Soundtrack
The music for the movie was composed by Debarpito Saha, with songs featuring Abhay Jodhpurkar and Mohan Kanan. The lyrics were written by Tejas Modak and Sunil Suptankar.

Reception 
Mihir Bhange from The Times of India wrote "Pondicherry may not strike the perfect chords with regular viewers. But for those who follow global cinema, this film is a treat to watch". Nandini Ramnath from Scroll.in wrote "Sai Tamhankar, among the few actors who can effortlessly suggest enigma and reserve, is the most compelling member of the cast. Vaibhav Tatwawadi and Amruta Khanvilkar are saddled with uneven and implausible character graphs. Neena Kulkarni is a hoot as the scandal-mongering mother, but there’s nothing in her performance that we haven’t seen before".

Accolades

References

External links
 

2022 films
2020s Marathi-language films
Indian drama films
Films shot in Puducherry
Films directed by Sachin Kundalkar